A unison is an interval in music.

Unison may also refer to:

Companies and organizations
 Unison (trade union), a British trade union
 Unison Healthcare Group, a Taiwanese medical device distributor
 Unison Home Ownership Investors, an American home ownership investment company
 Unison Industries, an American manufacturer of aircraft parts
 Unison Networks, a New Zealand electricity distribution and fibre optic network company
 Unison World School, a girls' residential school in Dehradun, Uttarakhand, India
 Universidad de Sonora (UNISON), a Mexican university

Computing
 UNISoN (Social Network Analysis Tool), a Java application
 Unison (software), a cross-platform file synchronization tool
 Unison (Usenet client), a Usenet client for Mac OS X by Panic
 Unison: Rebels of Rhythm & Dance, a 2000 music video game by Tecmo for the PlayStation 2

Geography and history
 Unison, Virginia, US, a village
 Battle of Unison, an 1862 American Civil War battle near the village
 Unison Historic District

Music
 UniSon, a 2017 stage musical

Albums
 Unison (Celine Dion album) or the title song (see below), 1990
 Unison (video), by Celine Dion, 1991
 Unison (George Mraz and Zoe Rahman album) or the title song, 2013
 Unison (Shin Terai album), 1999
 Unison, by Angels and Agony, 2007

Songs
 "Unison" (song), by Junior, 1983; covered by Celine Dion (1990) and others
 "Unison", by Björk from Vespertine, 2001
 "Unison", by Gang of Youths from Total Serene, 2021
 "Unison", by Nicole Scherzinger from Big Fat Lie, 2014
 "Unison", by Talking Heads from Remain in Light, 1980

See also
 Unisong International Song Contest
 Unisonic (disambiguation)